Here is the discography of American R&B/soul vocal group The Pips.

Albums

Studio albums

Live albums

Soundtrack albums

Compilation albums

Singles

The early years (1958–1965)

 Notes
 Single credited to The Pips but nonetheless featuring Gladys Knight; the group's name change to Gladys Knight & the Pips hadn't taken place yet
 Recording by The Pips alone without Gladys Knight
 Single credited to Gladys Knight alone; may be a solo recording
 Single credited to Gladys Knight with "vocal background by the Pips"
 From November 30, 1963 to January 23, 1965, Billboard Magazine did not publish a Hot R&B songs chart; the peak positions for R&B singles listed during this period are from Cash Box Magazine.

The Soul (Motown) era (1966–1972)

The Buddah era (1973–1978)

The later years (1980–1988)

Other appearances

The Pips
Listed below are recordings made without Gladys Knight.

Studio albums

Singles

References

External links

Rhythm and blues discographies
Discographies of American artists
Soul music discographies